Movitz blåste en konsert (Movitz blew a concert) is epistle No. 51 in the Swedish poet and performer Carl Michael Bellman's 1790 song collection, Fredman's Epistles. The epistle is subtitled "Angående konserten på Tre Byttor" ("Concerning the concert at the Three Barrels"), naming a restaurant in Stockholm's Djurgården park. It was written after Bellman had become a court musician to the new King Gustav III in 1773. The melody was borrowed from George Frideric Handel's 1718 opera, Acis and Galatea.

The song describes a concert in an elegant setting, the performance taking place after an evening ball in a restaurant. It strikes a refined tone, mentioning the opera composer Baldassare Galuppi and the cellist and composer Anton Fils. This does not prevent Bellman from making the song humorous, with opportunities for the performer to imitate musical instruments, for elegance to be contrasted with tavern life, and for the real world to be contrasted with classical mythology with mentions of Eol and Neptune. The epistle has at least twice been translated into English verse.

Context

Song 

The epistle is subtitled "Angående konserten på Tre Byttor" ("Concerning the concert at the Three Barrels"), naming a restaurant in Stockholm's Djurgården park. The song describes a concert in an elegant setting, more formal than the earlier epistles, with the performance taking place after an evening ball in a restaurant.

Music 

The song is in  time. It has 6 verses, each consisting of 12 lines. The rhyming pattern is ABAB-CDCD-EEFE; the song was written in 1773, sometime from June onwards. 

Like epistle No. 12, the melody was borrowed from George Frideric Handel's 1718 opera Acis and Galatea, in this case from the "Cyclops' Dance" or "".

Lyrics

Reception and legacy

The scholar of literature Lars Lönnroth writes that Fredman and his Bacchanalian congregation adapted to Bellman's new role as a royal poet. Epistle 51 reflects the musical soirée of May 1773 held by the theatre manager Carl Stenborg with leading artists and members of Stockholm's Music Academy to celebrate the coronation of King Gustav III. The places of the distinguished musicians are taken by Movitz, Mollberg, and Ulla Winblad, but they have left the noise of the tavern to appear as professional musicians in one of Stockholm's more elegant restaurants. The song ends with "Vivat vår monark!" ("Long live our Monarch!"), something that sounds more appropriate to a salon than a typical Fredman tavern. However, Lönnroth writes, that may not be correct, as the song still contains burlesque elements: how can Ulla be duetting with herself in the first verse? – and "fighting like Poles" (verse 2) does not sound very sophisticated either. He notes that  suggests that the Three Barrels concert could be taken as a parody of royalist and bourgeois cultural life. Still, a more refined tone is present, with talk of arpeggios and a musical "air" by the Italian opera composer Baldassare Galuppi (verse 3). Bellman switches, too, between the salon and the outside world, and between the real and the mythological. The last verse begins "Eol storms across the sky, Night's lamps are put out; it rains and squalls, and Neptune from the water's surface casts ashore whales and his guests." After this, the singing and the music of bassoon and clarinettes resumes, a haven from the terrors outside.

Carina Burman comments in her biography that an elderly Bellman in the autumn of 1794 could still entertain his hosts with performances of the riotous wedding-epistle 40 (Ge rum i Bröllopsgåln din hund!) and epistle 51, where he pretended to accompany himself with all the wind instruments mentioned, so that the audience felt they were hearing French horn, clarinettes, flutes, and oboe. Everyone laughed more than they thought possible. 

The scholar of Swedish literature Staffan Björck calls the song a "bewitching music-epistle", and writes that Fredman's description constantly hovers between past and present. At the start of the first verse, Movitz "blew"; but at the end of the verse he addresses the audience in the present tense, "Let us be glad"; and the same pattern repeats in each subsequent verse, as "the now pushes itself forward and breaks through".

Epistle 51 has been recorded by Fred Åkerström on his 1969 album Fred sjunger Bellman; by Sven-Bertil Taube on his 1987 album Fredmans Epistlar och Sånger; and by Peter Ekberg Pelz on his 1985 album C. M. Bellman. It has been translated into English verse by  Hendrik Willem van Loon in 1939 and by Paul Britten Austin in 1977. The painter , planning to create an illustrated book of Fredman's Epistles, created a genre painting of The Concert at Tre Byttor, though he never completed the book.

Notes

References

Sources 

 
 
 
 
 
 
  (contains the most popular Epistles and Songs, in Swedish, with sheet music)
  (with facsimiles of sheet music from first editions in 1790, 1791)

External links 

 Text of Epistle 51 at Bellman.net

1773 compositions
Swedish songs
Fredmans epistlar